Geoffrey Harold Arnott (4 February 19023 April 1986) was an Australian company director and chairman of Arnott's Biscuits.

Early life
Arnott was born in Waratah, New South Wales, and attended Newington College from 1918 to 1920.

Business career
Geoffrey Arnott worked at Arnott's starting in 1921, where he began in the factory as part of the engineering shop. He moved to the administrative side 10 years later, and assisted with the provision of food supplies during World War II to Australian and Allied forces. He became the managing director in 1954 and a chairman in 1961, which he remained until retiring in 1975.

References

1902 births
1986 deaths
People educated at Newington College
Businesspeople from Sydney